Borgartún is a street in Reykjavík, Iceland, that in years leading up to the country's economic crisis became the centre of the city's financial district. Three of Iceland's four largest banks have their headquarters in the area: Arion banki, Íslandsbanki and Straumur.

A 19-story skyscraper, part of the Höfðatorg development, is located at Borgartún. As of 2012, the skyscraper is completed but the rest of the development remains unfinished. The location of the skyscraper has been controversial because it is located opposite a low-density residential street.

Also located in Borgartún is Höfði, a house built in 1909. Initially, it was the house of the French consul in Iceland. It was the place of the Iceland Summit when Ronald Reagan and Mikhail Gorbachev met there in 1986. It is now mainly used for ceremonies for the Reykjavík City municipality.

The western end of Borgartún houses a complex of buildings where the offices of many departments of the Reykjavík city government, including a centralised service centre, are housed. The service centre is home to the Icelandic national registry, Þjóðskrá Íslands.

See also 
 Laugavegur (Reykjavík): the main shopping street in Reykjavík

Streets in Reykjavík
Financial districts